The 2019–2020 Nigeria Professional Football League was the 49th season of the top-flight division of the Nigerian football league system and the 30th season since its rebranding as the
'Professional League'. The league started on 3 November 2019 but was cancelled in July due to the effects of the COVID-19 pandemic with no champions and no teams relegated. Enyimba were the defending champions, after winning the Super 6 play-offs the previous season

The league was initially halted on 18 March 2020 following a decision by the League Management Company to suspend the league due to the COVID-19 pandemic with no decision made on the league's resumption.
On 10 July 2020 however, the league was cancelled by the NFF for the second time in three seasons (after the 2018 season ended in a similar way), following an online meeting between its executive committee and the league board with no champions and no relegation or promotion from the National League, and stopped at Matchday 25.

As  a result of this, the league's representatives at the continental competitions next season were decided by the PPG system, which created confusion and disagreement among the teams as Rivers United refused to accept their CAF Confederation Cup spot initially given to them.

Based on the points per game system, Plateau United and Enyimba will represent the country at the 2020–21 CAF Champions League while Rivers United will participate at the CAF Confederation Cup, since the 2020 Federation Cup was cancelled, Kano Pillars, the 2019 Federation Cup champions, will take the second CAF Confederation Cup spot.

Teams
The league consisted of 20 teams, the 4 promoted teams from the Nigeria National League and the remaining 16 teams from the  previous season. On 28 November, Kwara United bought Delta Force's slot and replaced them in the league.

Note: Table lists in alphabetical order.

Locations

League table

Results

Season statistics

Scoring

Top scorers

Most assists

Clean sheets

News

This was the 30th Anniversary of the Nigerian Professional Football League since attaining professionalism in 1990.

 On 29 November 2019, Ifeanyi Ubah's bus was attacked by armed robbers near Lokoja, Kogi State's capital during a trip to Kano for their match against Jigawa Golden Stars which left players and members of the coaching crew "critically injured" according to the club.

Katsina United and Kano Pillars were fined N3.5 million($9) and N1.5 million($3.8) by the League Management Company on 25 January 2020 for their fans misconduct during their fixture 10 days earlier in Katsina.

In a similar incident, the 16 January 2020 fixture between Abia Warriors and Enyimba was  postponed to Monday, 17 January 2020 and played without spectators after the match was disrupted and couldn't be completed on the initial date. Abia Warriors were later fined by the League Management Company for fan violence.

Nasarawa United's defender Chineme Martins collapsed at the Lafia Township Stadium during a home league match versus Katsina United on 8 March 2020. He was attended to by medics and later rushed to an hospital where he was later confirmed dead. The Nigeria Football Federation ordered all NPFL clubs to provide all necessary medical equipment and personnel before hosting any other game. Owing to the poor first aid assistance at the stadium. All players wore black armbands and a minute's silence held before the commencement of all Matchday 24 games as tribute. A round of applause was held for him at the 20th minute of each game.

Enugu Rangers duo Ifeanyi George and Emmanuel Ogbu were involved in an auto crash which claimed their lives and the life of a third person. The accident occurred in Abudu at the Benin-Agbor road while the players were travelling to Lagos after the season was suspended due to the COVID-19 pandemic.

References

External links
Nigeria 2020, RSSSF.com

Nigeria Professional Football League seasons
2019–20 in Nigerian football
Nigeria
Nigeria Professional Football League